Zelenohirske is an urban-type settlement in Podilsk Raion of Odesa Oblast in Ukraine. It is located on the right bank of the Kodyma, a tributary of the Southern Buh. Zelenohirske hosts the administration of Zelenohirske settlement hromada, one of the hromadas of Ukraine. Population: 

Until 18 July 2020, Zelenohirske belonged to Liubashivka Raion. The raion was abolished in July 2020 as part of the administrative reform of Ukraine, which reduced the number of raions of Odesa Oblast to seven. The area of Liubashivka Raion was merged into Podilsk Raion.

Economy

Transportation
There is infrequent passenger traffic.

The settlement has road connections with Balta and, via Kryve Ozero, with Pervomaisk.

References

Urban-type settlements in Podilsk Raion